Innamincka Station, often called simply Innamincka, is a pastoral lease in the Australian state of South Australia. It operates as a cattle station.

The name of the station derives from two Aboriginal words meaning your shelter and your home.

History
Innamincka Station was established in 1872 by Robert Bostock as the first station and permanent settlement along Cooper Creek. In 1881, when the station and stock were sold to William Campbell for £60,000, it supported a herd of 8,000 cattle. 

He immediately sold 250 bullocks in the Adelaide yards, which were much admired for their "breeding and quality". Suffering financially after bad drought, Kidman sold the property in 1918; he later repurchased it.

In the late 1950s and the 1960s, the Australian energy company, Santos Limited, conducted a drilling program for oil and natural gas in the Cooper Basin, including at localities near Innamincka; the first commercial gas was discovered in 1963. Eventually 145 gas fields and 76 oil fields came into production, feeding into production facilities at Moomba,  to the south-west.

Floods and drought are characteristics of Australian outback localities. Those that affected Innamincka included the following:
 The Cooper Creek inundated the station in 1891.

 The locality was struck by a severe drought in 1902.

 The homestead was washed away during the floods of 1906.

 Between 1914 and 1916 the area was struck by drought, killing about 10,000 cattle at Innamincka.

 During floods in 1939, water levels came within  of the 1906 mark.

 The entire area was struck by drought in 1946, causing many cattle deaths and destocking of properties.

 The area suffered severe flooding in March 1949 when it was hit with record rainfall.

 In 1953 the property only received  of rain and only  in 1954.

The station had an excellent season in 1981; the country was reported as having "masses of yellow and white wildflowers".

References

Notes

See also
List of ranches and stations
List of the largest stations in Australia

External Links

Far North (South Australia)
Stations (Australian agriculture)
Pastoral leases in South Australia
1872 establishments in Australia